The Common Application (more commonly known as the Common App) is an undergraduate college admission application that applicants may use to apply to over 1,000 member colleges and universities in all 50 U.S. states and the District of Columbia, as well as in Canada, China, Japan, and many European countries. 

Member colleges and universities that accept the Common App are made up of over 250 public universities, 12 historically black colleges and universities, and over 400 institutions that do not require an application fee. It is managed by the staff of a not-for-profit membership association (The Common Application, Inc.) and governed by a 18-member volunteer Board of Directors drawn from the ranks of college admission deans and secondary school college counselors. Its mission is to promote access, equity, and integrity in the college admission process, which includes subjective factors gleaned from essays and recommendations alongside more objective criteria such as class rank.

Membership
Of the Common Application's over 1,000 member institutions, about one-third are "exclusive users" that use the Common Application as their only admissions application online or in print (listed https://www.commonapp.org/explore/). If the member has a separate proprietary application, they are required to give equal consideration to applicants using either form as a condition of membership.

Digital application system 
There are different Common Applications for first-year admission and transfer admission. Both versions allow the application to be filled out once online and submitted to all schools of the applicant's choosing, with the same information going to different schools. Once the application is submitted to a college online, it cannot be changed for that college; the student must contact the college directly if they wish to correct an error or provide more information. The Common Application also allows the student to submit and track other components of their application such as supplemental questions, recommendation letters, application fees, and school forms. Students may also roll over their account information within the Common App tab of the dashboard from year to year, using the same user name and password.

Although the Common Application allows applicants to self-report standardized test scores (including the SAT and ACT) and international educational qualifications (such as GCE A-levels or the Baccalauréat), some colleges require an official score report from a testing agency.

Competition

The Universal College Application was started in 2007 and as of March 2019, had 10 participating institutions.

The Coalition Application was created by selective consortium of colleges and universities known as the Coalition for Access, Affordability, and Success, in September 2015, in response to the Common Application's 2013 outages. The organization is now called the Coalition for College; more than 150 US-based universities participate. The Coalition application was created as a more "holistic" application, and includes "lockers" where students can create a portfolio starting in 9th grade.

The Common Black College Application (CBCA) was started in 1998 to augment the marketing and recruitment efforts of Historically Black Colleges and Universities (HBCU) while increasing the educational options for students interested in attending a HBCU. Students are able to complete the CBCA and apply to any number of the 60 currently participating Member Institutions at the same time for a one-time fee of $20. Students pay no other application fees.

See also
Coalition for College
College admissions in the United States
Transfer admissions in the United States
Universities and Colleges Admissions Service (UCAS), UK

References

External links
 

University and college admissions in the United States
 1975 establishments in the United States